Callochitonidae is a family of molluscs belonging to the order Chitonida.

Genera:
 Callochiton Gray, 1847
 Eudoxochiton Shuttleworth, 1853
 Leloupia Kaas & Van Belle, 1990
 Quaestiplax Iredale & Hull, 1929
 Vermichiton Kaas, 1991

References

Callochitonidae
Chiton families